Gerrit de Veer (–) was a Dutch officer on Willem Barentsz' second and third voyages of 1595 and 1596 respectively, in search of the Northeast passage.

De Veer kept a diary of the voyages and in 1597, was the first person to observe and record the Novaya Zemlya effect, and the first Westerner to observe hypervitaminosis A caused by consumption of the liver of a polar bear.

References 

16th-century Dutch explorers
Dutch diarists
Dutch polar explorers
Explorers of Svalbard
Explorers of the Arctic
16th-century diarists